= DermIS =

German dermatology website

The DermIS (Dermatology Internet Service or Dermatology Information System) is a web site providing images and information on diagnosis in dermatology. It is a project of the Department of Clinical Social Medicine of the University of Heidelberg and the Department of Dermatology of the University of Erlangen, and provides information in seven languages: Turkish, Japanese, Portuguese, Spanish, French, German and English. It includes the Dermatology Online Atlas (DOIA), a database of images of conditions.

== See also ==
- List of cutaneous conditions
